Krishna Vijayam is a 1950 Indian Tamil language film written and directed by Sundar Rao Nadkarni. The film featured Carnatic music singer N. C. Vasanthakokilam in the role of Narada. The film, based on the Epic story of Krishna avatar, featured later day playback singer A. L. Raghavan as the child Krishna. Adult Krishna was played by P. V. Narasimha Bharathi.

Plot 
The film is about the epic story of Krishna, an avatar of Lord Vishnu. The story is about his birth, elimination of his uncle, the King Kamsa and his boyhood leelas with gopikas.

Cast 

 R. Balasubramaniam as Kamsan
 Master A. L. Raghavan as Young Krishna
 P. V. Narasimha Bharathi as Radhakrishnan
 S. A. Natarajan
 N. C. Vasanthakokilam as Naradar
 T. Premavathi as Radha
 M. S. S. Bhagyam
 M. Lakshmiprabha
Dance
 Lalitha and Padmini as Gopikas

Production 
A. L. Raghavan was contracted with Baala Gaana Vinodha Sabha, a theatre troupe. Somasundaram Chettiar of Jupiter Pictures, impressed with his singing and acting prowess, decided to cast him as the younger Krishna in Krishna Vijayam, and gave  to the theatre troupe to terminate Raghavan's contract with them. This was in 1946, when Raghavan was 13 years old.

Soundtrack 
Music was composed by S. M. Subbaiah Naidu and C. S. Jayaraman. Lyrics were penned by Papanasam Sivan, T. K. Sundara Vathiyar, Bhoomi Palakadas and K. P. Kamakshi. Singers are N. C. Vasanthakokilam, A. L. Raghavan & K. S. Angamuthu.  Playback singers are T. M. Soundararajan, Thiruchi Loganathan, S. S. Mani Bhagavathar, P. Leela, K. V. Janaki, T. V. Rathnam & T. R. Bhagirathi.

The music for "Navaneetha Kannaney..." was scored by C. S. Jayaraman and the lyrics were written by K. P. Kamakshi. T. M. Soundararajan sang his first song "Radhey Nee Ennai Vittu Pokaathadi".

Reception 
Though the film was well made with melodious music, it did not fare as well as expected. The reason may be that by this time, the interest in epic-based stories started waning among the viewers. Specially because it was only the same Jupiter Pictures that previously made Velaikaari, a socially themed story that was well received by the people.

References

External links 
 

1950 films
1950s Tamil-language films
Films about Krishna
Films directed by Sundar Rao Nadkarni
Hindu mythological films
Indian black-and-white films
Indian epic films
Jupiter Pictures films